Kelly Marsh-Taitano, is a Guamanian politician who is a member of Democratic and was senator in the 35th Guam Legislature. A member of the majority party, Marsh-Taitano was selected as Assistant Majority Leader by her colleagues and chaired the Committee on Heritage and the Arts, Parks, Guam Products, Hagatna Revitalization, Self-Determination, and Regional Affairs.

Early life
Kelly Marsh-Taitano was born on December 24, 1964, to her parents Gaynell Bob Marsh and Catherine Ann Becker.

Biographical Note
Kelly Marsh-Taitano earned a Bachelor of Arts in History and Anthropology and a Master of Arts in Micronesian Studies from the University of Guam in Mangilao, Guam. Marsh-Taitano earned a Ph.D. in Cultural Heritage Studies from Charles Sturt University in Albury-Wodonga, Australia, in 2013.

Prior to her election to the Guam Legislature, Kelly Marsh-Taitano worked as an adjunct professor at the University of Guam.

Marsh-Taitano is married to Tyrone Taitano and resides in Asan, Guam.

Entry into public life
Marsh-Taitano ran for the incoming 35th Guam Legislature in 2018. She placed 10th in the Democratic primary election in August, advancing to the general election. She placed 11th in the general election in November, earning a seat in the legislature. 

Marsh-Taitano sought reelection for the 36th Guam Legislature in 2020. She advanced to the general election by default since Guam's 2020 primary election was canceled due to COVID-19. In the November general election, she placed 16th, narrowing missing the ability to gain a seat in the incoming legislature.

Kelly Marsh-Taitano is running for the seat in the 37th Guam Legislature in 2022. The primary election is set for August 27th, 2022. Her placement in the primary will determine if she moves forward to the general election.

See also
 Guam Legislature
 Democratic Party of Guam

References

External links
 Guam Legislature's official website

21st-century American politicians
21st-century American women politicians
Charles Sturt University alumni
Guamanian Democrats
Guamanian women in politics
Living people
Members of the Legislature of Guam
University of Guam alumni
1964 births